Sanford Beauregard Sweeney (September 20, 1862 - July 16, 1917) was an assistant Secretary of the Interior from 1914 to 1917.

Biography 
He was born in Missouri on September 20, 1862, to Joshua Sweeney and Martha Weldon Haley. On July 1, 1897 he married Lillina Reeves. He died on July 16, 1917, in Washington, D.C., from heart problems.

References 

1862 births
1917 deaths
United States Assistant Secretaries of the Interior
People from Missouri